Kim Hyon-hui (born 15 September 1979) is a former table tennis player from North Korea. Kim is a Merited Athlete. Kim later married a University student, and thus retired.

References

1979 births
Living people
North Korean female table tennis players
Asian Games medalists in table tennis
Table tennis players at the 1998 Asian Games
Table tennis players at the 2002 Asian Games
Medalists at the 1998 Asian Games
Medalists at the 2002 Asian Games
Asian Games gold medalists for North Korea
Asian Games silver medalists for North Korea
Asian Games bronze medalists for North Korea
Table tennis players at the 1996 Summer Olympics
Table tennis players at the 2004 Summer Olympics
Olympic table tennis players of North Korea